KTSN (1060 AM) is a radio station licensed to Lockhart, Texas, United States, serving the Austin area. The station is currently owned by Township Media, LLC, and broadcasts a hybrid Adult Album Alternative / Americana format branded as Sun Radio.

History
KHRB signed on March 15, 1967, as Lockhart's first radio station. It was owned by Heath–Reasoner Broadcasters (Dan Heath of Lockhart and Marion Reasoner of Fort Worth) and operated with 250 watts. Radio Caldwell County acquired the station in 1973 and changed the call sign to KCLT. Triple R Broadcasting purchased it in 1979.

The station was assigned the call letters KHJK on November 8, 1983. On February 9, 1988, the station changed its call sign to KFIT.

The station operated as a 250-watt daytimer located in Lockhart for many years. The late Mike Venditti, working with prolific consultant Don Werlinger (one time principal of KFCC Bay City, Texas) worked to relocate the station to the 3-tower, 2,000-watt operation it is today. Upon moving toward Austin, the station adopted a Christian and secular talk format.

On May 29, 2022, following the acquisition of KFIT by Township Media, KFIT began originating the adult album alternative and americana "Sun Radio" format previously originated by KTSN (1490 AM), now KJFK), feeding K261DW (100.1 FM) among other signals. The two stations swapped call signs on June 3, 2022.

Repeaters
Sun Radio rebroadcasts on numerous FM outlets, including translator stations, plus a low power (LP) station and an HD radio subchannel, all located around Central Texas. Most are owned by the Sun Radio Network or a co-owned subsidiary. KDRP-LP 103.1 MHz in Dripping Springs is owned by Principle Broadcasting Foundation. Sun Radio also leases the HD3 subchannel of KLZT 107.1 in Bastrop, which is owned by Sinclair Telecable Inc. and operates under the name Waterloo Media.

There is also a service agreement to provide underwriting sales for KOWO-LP 104.1 MHz, in Wimberley, operating as Wimberley Texan Radio. Mary López owns a translator associated with this station before its switch to Sun Radio.

References

External links

TSN
Radio stations established in 1967
1967 establishments in Texas
TSN
Adult album alternative radio stations in the United States